Coleophora milvipennis is a moth of the family Coleophoridae. It is found in all of Europe, east to Japan (Hokkaido).

The wingspan is 10–13 mm. Plain buff brown forewing with a pale costal streak. Only reliably identified by dissection and microscopic examination of the genitalia.

Adults are on wing in one generation per year from late June to July.

The larvae feed on Alnus glutinosa, Alnus incana, Alnus viridis, Betula nana, Betula pubescens, Carpinus betulus, Corylus avellana and Myrica gale. They create a spatulate leaf case. It is slender, bivalved and 8–11 mm long, with a slight curve at the rear end. The end is laterally compressed. The mouth angle is about 45°. The fleck mines are often conspicuously brown. Larvae can be found almost year-round.

References

External links
 
 Bestimmungshilfe für die in Europa nachgewiesenen Schmetterlingsarten
 Coleophora milvipennis at Ukmoths

milvipennis
Moths described in 1839
Moths of Asia
Moths of Europe
Taxa named by Philipp Christoph Zeller